KT&G Corporation, originally Korea Tobacco & Ginseng, is the leading tobacco company in South Korea with annual sales over US$4 billion. KT&G was originally a government-owned monopoly but was privatized and today is publicly traded, competing for market share with other international tobacco firms such as Philip Morris International, British American Tobacco, and Japan Tobacco. KT&G's sales volume share was 62% of the Korean market in 2009.

KT&G also owns significant subsidiaries such as Korea Ginseng Corporation, Yungjin Pharm (a pharmaceuticals company), and several bio ventures. Its headquarters are in Daejeon.

Brands
KT&G produces popular Korean cigarette brands such as The One, Indigo, Arirang, This, This Plus, Zest, Esse, Raison, and Lo Crux. It has been expanded outside Korea, especially through its superslim brand Esse in Russia and other Eastern European markets.

See also
 Smoking in South Korea

References

External links

1989 establishments in South Korea
2002 initial public offerings
Food and drink companies of South Korea
Tobacco companies of South Korea
Companies listed on the Korea Exchange
Chaebol
Companies based in Daejeon
Manufacturing companies established in 1989

Government-owned companies of South Korea